Chicken Tinga is a Mexican dish made with shredded chicken in a sauce made from tomatoes, chipotle chilis in adobo, and sliced onions. It is often served on a tostada and accompanied by a layer of refried beans. It can be topped with avocado slices, crumbled cheese, Mexican crema, and salsa.

Origin 
Although tinga is consumed throughout central and southern Mexico today, it is presumed to have a Pueblan origin. In his Dictionary of Mexicanisms (1895), Francisco J. Santamaría defines "tinga" as a colloquial term to refer to something "vulgar" or "disorderly", though he does not give the etymology of the word. In recent years this cuisine has been expanding across the borders and can be found in most Mexican restaurants. Determining the exact place "tinga" originated is difficult due to the lack of sufficient records and information about the dish.

References

Mexican beef dishes
Mexican chicken dishes
Mexican cuisine